Events from the year 1992 in Michigan.

Top Michigan news stories
Broadcast and newspaper members of the Associated Press voted on the top news stories in Michigan for 1992 as follows:

 General Motors' problems with plant closings, labor unrest, and management upheaval
 Presidential candidates in Michigan. In the 1992 United States presidential election between George H. W. Bush, Bill Clinton, and Ross Perot, the candidates made repeated visits to the state. The final presidential debate was held at Michigan State University in East Landing on October 19, 1992.
 Jack Kevorkian's acquittal of murder and his role in assisting five additional suicides during the year
 The death of Malice Green and prosecution of four Detroit police officers
 Changes in Michigan's Congressional delegation including the loss of two seats due to reapportionment
 Leslie Williams case. The arrest and conviction of 38-year-old serial killer Leslie Williams. Williams was paroled from prison in August 1990 and went on a crime spree that included murdering four teenage girls (Cynthia Jones, sisters Michelle and Melissa Urbin, and Kami Villanueva), raping a nine-year-old, kidnapping a woman, and sexually assaulting other women. He was arrested in May 1992 when a witness saw him in the act of abducting a woman in a cemetery. Williams grew up in Garden City, Michigan, where his mother was a prostitute and his father was convicted of sexually molesting two step-daughters. Williams had a long criminal history and had been declared a habitual offender after he was convicted in 1983 of assault with intent to kidnap and to sexually penetrate.
 Welfare reform. Changes in Michigan's welfare system, including a request that recipients work, go to school, or volunteer their time.
 Dow Corning breast implants controversy. Facing mass litigation over leaks from its silicone breast implants, Dow Corning announced in March 1992 that it would cease manufacturing the implants.
 Conviction of William Hart.  In May 1992, a federal jury found former Detroit Police Chief William Hart guilty of embezzling almost $2.6 million from the City of Detroit. Hart in 1976 became the first African-American police chief in a major U.S. city.
 Magic Johnson's return to the NBA and subsequent retirement and a lawsuit by a woman alleging that Johnson had infected her with the AIDS virus

Office holders

State office holders
 Governor of Michigan: John Engler (Republican)
 Lieutenant Governor of Michigan: Connie Binsfeld (Republican) 
 Michigan Attorney General: Frank J. Kelley (Democrat)
 Michigan Secretary of State: Richard H. Austin (Democrat)
 Speaker of the Michigan House of Representatives: Lewis N. Dodak (Democrat)
 Majority Leader of the Michigan Senate: Dick Posthumus (Republican)
 Chief Justice, Michigan Supreme Court:

Mayors of major cities
 Mayor of Detroit: Coleman Young
 Mayor of Grand Rapids: Gerald R. Helmholdt
 Mayor of Flint: Woodrow Stanley
 Mayor of Lansing: Terry John McKane
 Mayor of Ann Arbor: Elizabeth Brater

Federal office holders

 U.S. Senator from Michigan: Donald W. Riegle Jr. (Democrat)
 U.S. Senator from Michigan: Carl Levin (Democrat) 
 House District 1: John Conyers (Democrat)
 House District 2: Carl Pursell (Republican)
 House District 3: Howard Wolpe (Republican)
 House District 4: Fred Upton (Republican)
 House District 5: Paul B. Henry (Republican)
 House District 6: Bob Carr (Democrat)
 House District 7: Dale Kildee (Democrat)
 House District 8: J. Bob Traxler (Democrat)
 House District 9: Guy Vander Jagt (Republican)
 House District 10: Dave Camp (Republican)
 House District 11: Robert William Davis (Republican)
 House District 12: David Bonior (Democrat)
 House District 13: Barbara-Rose Collins (Democrat)
 House District 14: Dennis M. Hertel (Democrat)
 House District 15: William D. Ford (Democrat)
 House District 16: John Dingell (Democrat)
 House District 17: Sander Levin (Democrat)
 House District 18: William Broomfield (Republican)

Population

Sports

Baseball
 1992 Detroit Tigers season – Under manager Sparky Anderson, the Tigers compiled a 75–87 record and finished sixth in American League East. The team's statistical leaders included Scott Livingstone with a .282 batting average, Cecil Fielder with 35 home runs and 124 RBIs, Bill Gullickson with 14 wins, and John Kiely with a 2.13 earned run average.

American football
 1992 Detroit Lions season – Under head coach Wayne Fontes, the Lions compiled a 5–11 record and finished third in the NFC Central Division. The team's statistical leaders included Rodney Peete with 1,702 passing yards, Barry Sanders with 1,352 rushing yards, Herman Moore with 966 receiving yards, and Jason Hanson with 93 points scored.
 1992 Michigan Wolverines football team – Under head coach Gary Moeller, the Wolverines compiled a 9–0–3 record, won the Big Ten Conference championship, defeated Washington in the 1993 Rose Bowl, and were ranked No. 5 in the final AP poll. The team's statistical leaders included Elvis Grbac with 1,640 passing yards, Tyrone Wheatley with 1,357 rushing yards and 102 points scored, and Derrick Alexander with 740 receiving yards.
 1992 Michigan State Spartans football team – Under head coach George Perles, the Spartans compiled a 3–8 record. The team's statistical leaders included Jim Miller with 1,400 passing yards, Tico Duckett with 1,021 rushing yards, Mill Coleman with 586 receiving yards, and Craig Thomas with 90 points scored.
 1992 Detroit Drive season

Basketball
 1991–92 Detroit Pistons season – Under head coach Chuck Daly, the Pistons compiled a 48–34 record, finished third in the NBA's Central Division, and lost to the New York Knicks in the first round of the playoffs. The team's statistical leaders included Joe Dumars with 1,635 points scored, Isaiah Thomas with 560 assists, and Dennis Rodman with 1,530 rebounds.
 1991–92 Michigan Wolverines men's basketball team - Under head coach Steve Fisher, the team compiled a 24-8 record and advanced to the Final Four, losing to Duke in the national final. The season was the rookie year for the Fab Five. The team's statistical leaders included Jalen Rose with 597 points and 135 assists and Chris Webber with 340 rebounds.

Ice hockey
 1991–92 Detroit Red Wings season – Under head coach Bryan Murray, the Red Wings compiled a 43–25–12 record, finished first in the NHL Norris Division, and lost to the Chicago Blackhawks in the division finals. Steve Yzerman led the team with 45 goals, 58 assists, and 103 points. The team's principal goaltender was Tim Cheveldae (72 games).

Music and culture

Chronology of events

January

February

March

April

May

June

July

August

September

October

November

December

Births
 January 7 - Børns, singer, songwriter, and musician, in Muskegon, MI
 February 11 - Taylor Lautner, actor (Jacob Black in The Twilight Saga film series), in Grand Rapids, MI
 June 10 - Kate Upton, model and actress, in St. Joseph, MI

Gallery of 1992 births

Deaths
 February 1 - Otto Pommerening, All-American tackle at Michigan, at age 88 in West Bloomfield
 February 20 - Dick York, actor (Bewitched, Inherit the Wind), at age 63 in East Grand Rapids
 March 28 - Ernie Caddel, halfback for Detroit Lions 1934-1938, at age 81 in Roseville, California
 March 31 - Doug Roby, University of Michigan athlete and member of International Olympic Committee, at age 94 in Ann Arbor
 June 6 - E. Harold Munn, Chairman of the Prohibition Party (1955–1971), at age 88 in Hillsdale
 July 26 - Mary Wells, Motown singer (My Guy, Two Lovers, You Beat Me to the Punch, at age 49 in Los Angeles
 September 6 - Pat Harder, fullback for Detroit Lions NFL championship teams of 1951 and 1952, at age 70 in Waukesha, Wisconsin
 September 18 - Earl Van Dyke, main keyboardist for Motown's The Funk Brothers, at age 62 in Detroit
 September 22 - Aurelio López, pitcher for the Detroit Tigers known as "Señor Smoke", at age 44 in Mexico
 October 5 - Eddie Kendricks, member of The Temptations and lead vocalist on "The Way You Do The Things You Do", "Get Ready", and "Just My Imagination (Running Away with Me)", at age 52 in Birmingham, Alabama
 November 5 - Malice Green, African-American man whose death after police beating sparked controversy, at age 35 in Detroit

Gallery of 1992 deaths

See also
 History of Michigan
 History of Detroit

References